Pål Moddi Knutsen (born 18 February 1987 in Senja), known by the artist name Moddi, is a Norwegian musician, author and activist, whose contemporary folk music often includes songs of protest or social justice.

Background
Pål Knutsen grew up on the island of Senja in Northern Norway. As a child, he showed a particular concern for the environment, an interest which would come to shape his musical direction in the years to come. During high school, Knutsen was leading the local chapter of the environmentalist group Nature and Youth. "My first songs were an attempt to give a voice to the voiceless nature", he later explained about his motivation to create music.

Musical career
The first release under the name of Moddi was recorded in 2007 and distributed in 20 home-made copies. Later followed the debut album Floriography, recorded with producer Valgeir Sigurðsson in Iceland and containing songs from Knutsen's period in Nature and Youth. Q magazine described the album as "irrevocably heart-warming and beautifully constructed piece of melancholic folk-pop". On his second album, Moddi presented the single House By The Sea, his best known composition to date.

The same year saw the release of Kæm va du? ("Who were you?"), with lyrics borrowed from the Northern Norwegian poets such as Arvid Hanssen, Helge Stangnes and Ola Bremnes. The album also included the single "Togsang", a reinterpretation of Vashti Bunyans 60s cult hit "Train Song". Bunyan later commented that Moddi's was her favourite cover version of any of her songs. Kæm va du? won the Spellemannprisen award for "Folk Album of the Year".

In 2016, Moddi released his fourth studio album, "Unsongs", consisting of Moddi's reinterpretations and translations of banned and censored songs from 12 different countries. Among the artists included on the album were Pussy Riot (Russia), Izhar Ashdot (Israel), Mari Boine (Norway/Sápmi), Liu Xiaobo (China) and Kate Bush (UK). Following the release, Moddi published the book "Forbudte sanger" (Forbidden songs) where he described a number of attempts to hold back the songs on the album, among others by Russian and Lebanese authorities, and by the British public broadcaster BBC.

In 2019, Moddi released his fifth studio album "Like in 1968", inspired by the events that occurred in 1968.

Activism 
Moddi is known for bringing his strong political commitment into his music. In January 2010 Moddi refused nomination for the €100 000 Statoil grant on environmental grounds, commenting that a nomination would not be compatible with his environmental engagement. In 2014 Moddi announced that he would be cancelling his scheduled concert in Tel Aviv, Israel, on the grounds that he would not be taken to support the Israeli expansion of settlements in the West Bank. He did not officially endorse any organised appeal, stating that "the debate is already way too black and white".

When Moddi released his version of the Pussy Riot song Punk Prayer in 2016, he did so by recording a music video on the doorstep of the King Oscar II Chapel, marking the Northern border between Norway and Russia. On his concert in Kirkenes the same year, Moddi was pressured into dropping the same song after indirect pressure from Russian diplomats.

Education 
Pål Moddi Knutsen has a master's degree from the Centre for Development and the Environment (SUM) at the University of Oslo. In his master thesis "Visions through the smelting furnace", he studied the Norwegian smelting plant Finnfjord in their course towards a carbon-neutral ferrosilicon production process.

Discography

Studio albums

Extended plays

Live albums

Singles

Other appearances

Other releases
 2010 – Hjertestups withTogsang (Tyrili)
 2010 – Samleplate for oljefritt Lofoten, Vesterålen og Senja with the song Krokstav-emne
 2011 – Vi tenner våre lykter with the song Nordnorsk julesalme
 2012 – Norge, mitt Norge..? with the songs Det stig av hav eit oljeland and Deilig er Norden
 2015 – Fabler om en åpen folkekirke with the song Vær hilset, fru Bjerkås!

References

External links 

1987 births
Living people
Musicians from Senja
Norwegian folk musicians
Norwegian-language singers
Propeller Recordings artists